It was a Dacian fortified town.

References

Dacian fortresses in Alba County
Historic monuments in Alba County